Thomas H. Stoner Jr. is an energy entrepreneur and writer. He has been a promoter of sustainable development for over 30 years, having built, financed, and owned and operated renewable energy projects throughout the Americas. He has led three companies in the clean technology space, including one of the original CleanTech venture funds backed by the international development banks, including the Multilateral Investment Fund (MIF), a division of the Inter-American Development Bank. In 2011, with the aid of David Schimel of the Jet Propulsion Lab (NASA) and other leading climate figures, Stoner founded Project Butterfly, a research organization that primarily advocates for the global capital markets as being a solution to climate change. In 2013, Stoner released "Small Change, Big Gains: Reflections of an Energy Entrepreneur," which contains research about transforming the global energy supply to be more reliant upon sustainable fuel sources by the end of the century.

Stoner is currently the CEO of Entelligent, a provider of Smart Climate indices, predictive equity portfolio analytics, and advanced data.

Education and personal life 

Stoner received his Masters in accounting and finance from the London School of Economics and a BA from Hampshire College, Amherst, Massachusetts.
In 1988 he married Laurie Larsen; together they have two children.

In 1987, Stoner served as founding Director of the Social Venture Network

Career 

Most recently, Thomas Stoner Jr. launched Entelligent, a provider of Smart Climate indices, predictive equity portfolio analytics, and advanced data.

Stoner served as the Managing Partner at New Alchemy Energy Partners, a fund dedicated to developing distributed energy generation projects in North America.

From 2008 to 2010, Stoner served as the CEO and Chairman of Evergreen Energy Inc. (NYSE:EEE), a publicly traded coal and clean coal technology company with headquarters in Denver, Colorado.

From 1998 to October 2008, Stoner served as CEO of Econergy International, a carbon markets consultancy and owner/operator of renewable energy projects throughout the Americas. Econergy International floated on the AIM under the London Stock Exchange (ECG) in February 2006. Econergy was an independent power developer of renewable energy projects, including wind farms, small hydro, and methane fired power generation facilities throughout Americas as well as one of the leading carbon emissions traders under the Kyoto Protocol. Under Stoner's leadership Econergy developed the first methodology submitted to the governing body of the clean development mechanism (CDM), the United Nations Framework Convention on Climate Change (UNFCCC). Stoner led the sale of Econergy to GDF Suez, one of the largest utilities in the world. While at Econergy, Stoner helped five international development banks to develop the CleanTechFund, a $25 million private equity fund focused on small-scale energy generation (such as wind, hydro, biomass and geothermal power plants) and energy efficiency projects in Latin America. He served as the Senior Manager of the fund from its formation in 2004 to 2008.

Prior to Econergy, Stoner founded and served as president of the Highland Energy Group, a national energy service company (ESCO) providing demand side management (DSM) services to public utilities, such as the Public Service Company of Colorado, Duke Power, and Texas Utilities. Stoner led the sale of the company to Eastern Utilities, formerly a NYSE traded public utility headquartered in Boston, Massachusetts.

Prior to Econergy, Stoner was the first acting director and founding board member of the Social Venture Network, a nonprofit membership organization composed of socially responsible business leaders who are committed to creating a more just and sustainable world.

Stoner has served as a technical advisor in more than a dozen countries.

Project Butterfly 

Project Butterfly was founded in 2010 and is a collaboration among scientists, business leaders, and the global community to address the threats posed by climate change, and researching opportunities that exist in mitigating it. The initiative, started by Stoner, brought together individuals from the Massachusetts Institute of Technology (MIT), NASA, the National Renewable Energy Lab (NREL), the National Center for Atmospheric Research (NCAR), and the University of Colorado at Boulder. The research and climate modeling performed under Project Butterfly led to the book "Small Change, Big Gains: Reflections of an Energy Entrepreneur”.

Publications and appearances 
What Climate Change Means for Investors
Donald Trump is about to become an even bigger champion of coal and fracking
Investors must adjust their portfolios now for a changing climate
Why Big Oil might secretly wish for a carbon tax  
Opinion: Exxon Mobil cover-up case shows why energy investors need a new strategy
Paris: Subsidies, taxes and the energy investor
China Still Needs to Focus on Renewable Energy Despite Economic Slowdown
The problem with Obama's clean-energy plan
Panelist at Livingston Securities Advanced Energy Conference Denver, CO
Panelist at 2015 Burridge Conference, Burridge Center for Finance at University of Colorado Boulder, CO 
Instructor at Viridis Graduate Institute Ecopsychology and Environmental Humanities course: Economics, Humans & Environment
Invited member for "Committee on Determinants of Market Adoption of Advanced Energy Efficiency and Clean Energy Technologies" at the National Academy of Sciences 
Small Change Big Gains: Reflections of an Energy Entrepreneur, 2013.  556p.
A Financial Model for Evaluating Projects with Performance Contracts Report to the Energy Efficiency Financial Task Force 
The Most Important Climate Change Question: How Will Investors React?
Smart Grid: On a Path Toward Climate Stability?
Divestment and Climate Change: Thomas Stoner at TEDxHampshire
Carbon Taxes Shifts us From Polluting to Non-Polluting

See also 

Renewable energy commercialization
Renewable energy policy
Renewable energy industry
Energy security and renewable technology
Anti-nuclear movement in the United States
Clean Coal
Cleantech
Renewable Energy
Social Venture Network
Kyoto Protocol
Clean Development Mechanism

References

External links 
London Stock Exchange – AIM
September, 2008 Econergy Intl. Plc Interim Results
Econergy International PLC Proyecto Eolico Guanacaste (PEG) Project Signs Turbine Supply Agreement
GDF Suez

1960 births
Living people
Alumni of the London School of Economics
American energy industry executives
Sustainability advocates
Hampshire College alumni
People associated with renewable energy